Aloysius Yapp (born 2 May 1996) is a Singaporean professional pool player. He was world junior champion in nine-ball in 2014 and runner-up in the 2021 U.S. Open Pool Championship.

Career
Yapp began playing pool at age eight. An alumnus of Saint Patrick's School, he dropped out of school in 2011 to turn professional, although he eventually completed his GCE Ordinary Level examinations at Coleman College. Reportedly the first professional pool player from Singapore, he won the inaugural Asian Junior Pool Championship in 2014. Later that year, he became the first Singaporean to claim a world title in pool when he won the World Junior Pool Championships (Under-19) in Shanghai, China, beating Hsu Jui-an 11–10. In 2021, he claimed the Singapore National Snooker Championship, defeating defending champion Peter Gilchrist 4–2. In the quarter-finals of the 2021 WPA World Ten-ball Championship, Yapp defeated Jayson Shaw, which moved him up to 8th in the world rankings; he ultimately finished in third place.

In the 2021 U.S. Open Pool Championship, Yapp survived a scare against Wojciech Szewczyk in the third round of the winners bracket by winning 11–10, before scoring upsets in quick succession against defending champion Joshua Filler 11–4 in the fourth round of the winners bracket and Shane Van Boening 11–5 in the Last 16. He went on to defeat both Rodrigo Geronimo and Dennis Orcollo by a scoreline of 11–6 in the quarterfinals and semifinals respectively, before losing to Carlo Biado 8–13 in the final, concluding his best finish in a major tournament. The following week, he won the CueSports International (CSI) Michigan 10-Ball Open, defeating Roberto Gomez 4–0, 4–2 in the final. He successfully defended his Michigan Open title the following year, defeating Robbie Capito 4–2, 4–1 in the final. The following month, he beat Chang Jung-Lin 7–6 in the final of the Sandcastle 9-Ball Open.

In 2022, he won a bronze medal at the 2022 World Games in Birmingham, Alabama for nine-ball.

Titles
 2022 Meucci Classic 10-Ball 
 2022 Meucci Classic 9-Ball 
 2022 Pro Billiard Series Michigan Open 
 2022 Sandcastle 9-Ball Open
 2021 Pro Billiard Series Michigan Open 
 2017 Southeast Asian Games Nine-ball Doubles 
 2017 Golden Break 9-ball Open 
 2014 WPA World Nine-ball Junior championship

References

1996 births
Living people
Singaporean pool players
People from Singapore
Southeast Asian Games medalists in cue sports
Southeast Asian Games gold medalists for Singapore
Southeast Asian Games silver medalists for Singapore
Southeast Asian Games bronze medalists for Singapore
Competitors at the 2015 Southeast Asian Games
Competitors at the 2017 Southeast Asian Games
Competitors at the 2019 Southeast Asian Games
Competitors at the 2021 Southeast Asian Games
World Games bronze medalists
Competitors at the 2022 World Games
20th-century Singaporean people
21st-century Singaporean people